Guildfordia is a genus of sea snails, marine gastropod mollusks in the family Turbinidae, the turban snails.

Description
The imperforate shell is wheel-shaped. It is low-conic and granulose above, convex below. The periphery is armed with long slender radiating spines, which are concealed at the sutures. The operculum is flat, with a subobsolete arcuate rib outside. The central tooth of the radula has no cusps.

Distribution
This marine genus occurs off the Philippines, Indo-China, Indo-Malaysia, Papua New Guinea, Eastern Indian Ocean, Oceania, and off Australia (Northern Territory, Queensland, Western Australia).

Species
Species within the genus Guildfordia include:

 Guildfordia aculeata Kosuge, 1979 - Aculeate Star Turban 
  † Guildfordia hendersoni (Marwick, 1934)
  † Guildfordia megapex (Beu, 1970)
 † Guildfordia ostarrichi Pacaud, 2017 
 Guildfordia radians Dekker, 2008
  † Guildfordia subfimbriata (Suter, 1917)
 Guildfordia superba Poppe, Tagaro & Dekker, 2005 - Superb Star Turban 
 Guildfordia triumphans (Philippi, 1841) - Triumphant Star Turban 
 Guildfordia yoka Jousseaume, 1888 - Yoka Star Turban 
Species brought into synonymy
 Guildfordia delicata Habe & Okutani, 1983: synonym of Guildfordia yoka Jousseaume, 1888
 Guildfordia gloriosa Kuroda & Habe in Kira, 1961: synonym of Bolma henica (Watson, 1885)
 Guildfordia heliophorus Gray: synonym of Astraea heliotropium (Martyn, 1784)
 Guildfordia kurzi Petuch, 1980 - Kurz's Star Turban: synonym of Guildfordia aculeata Kosuge, 1979
 Guildfordia tagaroae Alf & Kreipl, 2006: synonym of Guildfordia aculeata Kosuge, 1979
Taxon inquirendum
 Guildfordia monilifera (Hedley & Willey, 1896)  (possibly a synonym of Guildfordia aculeata)

References

 Marwick, J. (1934) Some New Zealand Tertiary Mollusca. Proceedings of the Malacological Society of London, 21, 10–21, 2 pls.
 Beu, A. G. (1970). Descriptions of new species and notes on taxonomy of New Zealand Mollusca. Transactions of the Royal Society of New Zealand, Earth Science. 7: 113-136
 Alf A. & Kreipl K. (2011) The family Turbinidae. Subfamilies Turbininae Rafinesque, 1815 and Prisogasterinae Hickman & McLean, 1990. In: G.T. Poppe & K. Groh (eds), A Conchological Iconography. Hackenheim: Conchbooks. pp. 1–82, pls 104-245

External links
 Gray J.E. (1850). [text. In: Gray, M. E., Figures of molluscous animals, selected from various authors. Longman, Brown, Green and Longmans, London. Vol. 4, iv + 219 pp. (August) [Frontispiece (portrait of Mrs. Gray); pp. ii–iv (preface); 1–62 (explanation of plates 1–312 in Volumes 1–3); pp. 63–124 (systematic arrangement of figures); 127–219 (reprint of Gray 1847)]
 Fischer P. (1873-1879). [continuation of Kiener] Spécies général et iconographie des coquilles vivantes. Volume 10, Famille des Turbinacées. Genre Turbo (Turbo), pp. i-iv + 1-128 (1873), pls 1, 28, 44-49, 53-54, 57-120. Volume 11, Genres Troque (Trochus, including Calcar), pp. 1–96, pls 37-86 (1875); 97-144 (1876); 145-240 (1877); 241-336 (1878); 337-423, Xenophora pp. 424–450, Tectarius pp. 451–459, Risella pp. 460–463, Index 464-480 (1879).
 Finlay H.J. (1926). A further commentary on New Zealand molluscan systematics. Transactions of the New Zealand Institute. 57: 320-485, pls 18-23
  Williams, S.T. (2007). Origins and diversification of Indo-West Pacific marine fauna: evolutionary history and biogeography of turban shells (Gastropoda, Turbinidae). Biological Journal of the Linnean Society, 2007, 92, 573–592

 
Turbinidae
Gastropod genera